The plant genus Oedematopus is nowadays a synonym of Clusia.

Oedematopus is a genus of flies in family Dolichopodidae.

Species
Oedematopus crassitibia Van Duzee, 1929
Oedematopus moraviensis Naglis, 2011
Oedematopus vidua (Becker, 1922)

References

Hydrophorinae
Dolichopodidae genera
Diptera of South America